Nureyev is a ballet choreographed by Kirill Serebrennikov and Yuri Posokhov with a score by Ilya Demutsky. The premiere of Nureyev took place at the Historical Scene of the Bolshoi Theatre on 9 December 2017.

The scope of this ballet based on the biography of ballet dancer Rudolf Nureyev who was born in the Soviet Union and then escaped from his native country.

Background 
Kirill Serebrennikov and Yuri Posokhov created their second ballet performance. The first one was A Hero of Our Time in 2015.

The Bolshoi Theatre added Nureyev to the repertoire of the 241st season (2016/17). A premiere was planned on 11 July 2017. The music score and libretto were completed in the winter. 

A general rehearsal took place in the Bolshoi Theatre in July. Then, the director of the theatre Vladimir Urin stated that a premiere of Nureyev cancelled. Vladimir Medinsky called the performance as gay propaganda and newspapers stated it as the main reason of the cancellation. In the addition, Kirill Serebrennikov was accused of embezzlement of 68 million roubles.

In September 2017 a new date, 9 December, of a premiere was named. Tickets for the first performance of Nureyev were on sale on 18 November.

9 December 2017 the premiere of Nureyev took place at the Historical Scene of the Bolshoi Theatre, starring Vladislav Lantratov as Rudolf Nureyev.

Original interpreters 
The first interpreters (9 December 2017) state below:

References 

2017 ballet premieres
Ballets premiered at the Bolshoi Theatre